Alexander Polzin (born 1973) is a German sculptor, painter, graphic artist, costume and set designer.

Life 
Born in Berlin, originally trained as a stonemason, Polzin launched his international career as a freelance sculptor, painter, graphic artist and stage designer in 1991, building on the success of his first exhibition in Berlin's Kulturhaus-Pankow four years earlier. In 1994 Polzin was invited by Dr. Gary Smith, founding director of the Einstein Forum in Potsdam, to present the first exhibition of solo work at the Institute: Arbeiten im Einstein Forum. The introduction to the exhibition catalogue was written by Professor Hans Belting.  Polzin's series of paintings, Monster, appeared in a collection of images and essays edited by the pioneering American cultural historian, Sander Gilman, published in 1995.

Exhibitions of his works include the Getty Center in Los Angeles (2000), Budapest, Bucharest and Naples (2001), at the Institute for Advanced Study Berlin (2004), Bard College, New York (2006), Van Leer Institute of Israel (2007), San Francisco International Arts Festival (2008) and at the Teatro Real in Madrid (2011).  Sculptures in public places include "The Fallen Angel" in front of the Semper Observatory Collegium Helveticum in Zurich, the "Giordano Bruno Memorial" in Potsdamer Platz in Berlin, "Socrates" on the campus of Tel Aviv University, and "The Couple," commissioned by the Opera National de Bastille, Paris.  Polzin's sculptures are all cast by Marc Krepp.

Polzin has worked with the composers Amos Elkana, Helmut Lachenmann and György Kurtág connecting their music with visual arts. Polzin was a guest at the International Artist House in Herzliya, Israel, ETH Zurich, The Montalvo Arts Center in Saratoga, California and first 'Artist in Residence' at the Center for Advanced Study at the Käte Hamburger Kolleg "Law as Culture" in Bonn.  Polzin taught as a guest professor at the ETH Zurich and the University of California at Santa Cruz.  Polzin regularly works as a set designer for opera, dance and drama.

Stage and costume designs (selection)
 2015 – Stage design Mauricio Sotelo "El Público" (World Premiere) Teatro Real, Madrid, Director: Robert Castro – Conductor: Pablo Heras-Casado
 2015 – Stage design Christoph Willibald Gluck "Iphigénie en Tauride" Grand Théâtre de Genève, Director: Lukas Hemleb – Conductor: Hartmut Haenchen
 2014 – Direction and Stage design Ludwig van Beethoven "Fidelio" Tiroler Festspiele Erl, Co-director: Sommer Ulrickson, Conductor: Gustav Kuhn
 2014 – Stage design Richard Wagner "Lohengrin" Teatro Real (Madrid), Director: Lukas Hemleb – Conductor: Hartmut Haenchen
 2013 – Stage design Richard Wagner "Parsifal" Beijing Music Festival
 2013 – Stage design Wolfgang Rihm "The Conquest of Mexico" Teatro Real (Madrid), Director: Pierre Audi – Conductor: Alejo Pérez
 2013 – Stage design Richard Wagner "Parsifal" Salzburg Easter Festival Director: Michael Schulz – Conductor: Christian Thielemann
 2012 – Stage/costume design "Never Mind" in Sophiensaele / Berlin – Director: Sommer Ulrickson
 2012 – Stage design "Sing Brother Sing" Hao Jiang Tian in China NCPA Concert Hall Orchestra Beijing/Shanghai
 2011 – Stage design "La página en blanco" Teatro Real (Madrid), premiere – Composer Pilar Jurado – Director David Hermann
 2010 – Stage design "Kurs:Liebe" Freilichtspiele Schwäbisch Hall, Director: Sommer Ulrickson, Music: Moritz Gagern
 2010 – Stage design "Lovesick" Neuköllner Oper, Director: Sommer Ulrickson, Music: Moritz Gagern
 2010 – "Baucis and Philemon" by Joseph Haydn and Konstantia Gourzi – Festival Europäische Kirchenmusik, Schwäbisch Gmünd
 2009 – G. Verdi "Rigoletto" Deutsche Oper am Rhein, Director David Hermann
 2009 – Stage/costume design "Winter – a German fairytale" based on H.Heine – Schauspiel Frankfurt, Director Sommer Ulrickson/ Mark Jackson
 2009 – Stage design "After Hamlet" a dance music theatre production by Amos Elkana and Sommer Ulrickson in Santa Cruz, California.
 2008 – Stage design Benjamin Britten's "Rape of Lucretia" (Director: David Hermann) at Oldenburgisches Staatstheater
 2008 – Artistic Consultant for Sommer Ulrickson's "Foreign Bodies" University of California, Santa Cruz
 2007 – Stage design "Yes, Yes to Moscow" Deutsches Theater Berlin
 2007 – Stage design "Woyzeck" Staatstheater Schwerin
 2004 – Stage design "Creatures of Habit" Sophiensaele, Berlin
 2003 – Stage design "Slaughter" Hochschule für Film und Fernsehen, Potsdam
 2003 – Stage design "Jerusalem Syndrome" Sophiensaele, Berlin
 2003 – Stage design "Baucis and Philemon" Staatsoper Berlin 
 2002 – Stage design "Remains" Sophiensaele, Berlin

Sculptures and projects (selection)
2015 – Cover design for "Concepts and the Social order, Robert K. Merton and the Future of Sociology", Edited by Yehuda Elkana, András Szigeti, and György Lissauer, CEU Press
2015 – Cover design for "Reflexiones sobre la ópera, el arte, y la política" by Gerard Mortier
2014 – Visualisation of Edvard Grieg "Peer Gynt" for Bergen Philharmonic Orchestra, Conductor: Eivind Aadland 
2014 – Pictorial Representation of Leonard Bernstein's Symphony no. 2 "Age of Anxiety" for Aarhus Symphony Orchestra, Conductor: Benjamin Shwartz
2014 – Cover design for programme for 2014/15 season, Teatro Real, Madrid
2013 – Programme design for 2013/14 season, Teatro Real, Madrid
2013 – Cover design for Parsifal, Salzburg Easter Festival
2012 – Sculptural intervention for Helmut Lachenmann – Concert Celebration 
2012 – Programme design for Turku music festival Finland
2012 – Homage to Teatro Real for the magazine Intramuros
2011 – Unveiling of the sculpture "Homage to Bhimrao Ramji Ambedkar"; Käte Hamburger Kolleg "Law as Culture" in the presence of His Excellency Ajit Kumar, Consul General of the Republic of India in Frankfurt am Main
2010 – Book on Sculpture "Requiem – Homage to György Kurtág", Mathes und Seitz (Authors: Moshe Zuckermann, Jean Louis Fabiani, Peter Stefan Jungk, Judith Frigyesi Niran, Andre Plesu, Durs Gruenbein, Antjie Krog, Amnon Raz-Krakotzkin, Martin Treml, Almuth Sh. Bruckstein Coruh, Annett Groeschner, Michael Maede, Karl Heinz Barck, Peter Esterhazy, Hannah Duebgen, Michael Roes, Bettina Motikat)
2009 – Cover design – Oliver Schneller – Deutscher Musik Rat
2009 – Homage to Robert Merton – sound sculptures together with Amos Elkana for the conference "Concepts and the Social Order: Robert K. Merton and the Future of Sociology"
2009 – Cover design for Moshe Zuckermann "Sixty Years of Israel", Pahl-Rugenstein Publishers
2008/09 – Illustrations für Lettre International
2008 – Award Ceremony to Kofi Annan – recipient of the "kleine Bruno skulptur" (Open Society Prize)

2008 – Installation of Giordano Bruno Monument at Potsdamer Platz, Berlin (Bahnhof Potsdamer Platz – Deutsche Bahn AG). Speeches by the Italian Ambassador (Puri Purini) and German author Durs Grünbein
2008 – Memorial stone for George Tabori in the Dorotheenstadt cemetery, Berlin
2008 – Inauguration of the sculpture "The Couple" in the foyer of the Opera National de Paris  – speech by Prof. Hans Belting
2006 – Design and production of the Elemér Hantos Prize for the Central Europe Foundation, Zürich
2005 – "neunzehnter" exhibition in the Berliner Kunsthaus ACUD
2005 – Cover photo for Rigas Laiks (Kunstmagazin / Lettland)
2004 – Portrait of Josef Tal for CD recording by NDR Radio Philharmonie
2004 – Series of pictures and cover for book on Heiner Müller "Kalkfell II" Academy of the Arts
2003 – Series of six paintings of Thomas Brasch for a book published by the Academy of Arts, Berlin.  Bought for the Collection of Foreign Ministry
2002 – Sculptures commissioned for the ETH Zürich
2002 – Series of paintings Lettre International Herbst
2001 – Memorial stone for Thomas Brasch in the Dorotheenstadt cemetery Berlin
2001 – Presentation in the Arts Gallery, Berlin on Long Night of Sciences
2001 – Commission for the mural "Chaim's Brief" for the renovated Jewish Orphanage Berlin-Pankow / Installation of the granite sculpture "The Stone Merchant" in front of the orphanage
2000 – Central European University in Budapest: Giordano Bruno Monument (Sculpture)

Exhibitions (selection)
2015 – Kunstmuseum Ahrenshoop "Aus meinem Augenfenster...Hommage an Thomas Brasch"
2015 – Grand Théâtre de Genève
2015 – Maestro Arts, London "Remains – Opera, Art, Music"
2014 – Galerie Kornfeld, Berlin
2013 – Maestro Arts, London
2013 – Anna Akhmatova Literary and Memorial Museum, St. Petersburg
2013 – Salzburg Easter Festival
2011 – Sculptural exhibition Teatro Real Madrid
2011 – Presentation of the sculptures series äsentation der Skulpturenserie "Five sculptural sketches of Caravaggio's David and Goliath" with Prof. Hans Belting; Käte Hamburger Kolleg "Law as Culture" Bonn
2008 – ArtworkSF, San Francisco International Arts Festival
2008 – jw Galerie, Berlin
2007 – Van Leer Jerusalem Institute, Israel
2007 – International Artists House Herzliya, Israel
2007 – Solo Exhibition The Negev Museum of Art, Tel Be'er Sheva, Israel
2006 – Felicja Blumental Center Tel Aviv, Israel
2006 – Schloss Neuhardenberg, "Homage to Kurtag"
2006 – Bard College, New York
2006 – Solo Exhibition Goethe-Institut Los Angeles (opening speech: Hans Ulrich Gumbrecht)
2006 – Goethe-Institut New York (opening speech: Edward Mendelson)
2004 – Berlin Institute for Advanced Study (opening speech: Durs Grünbein)
2004 – "Age of Anxiety" Opendoors Openeyes – Bordeaux, France
2004 – shadow-collaborations, Chernoff Gallery, Novosibirsk, Russia
2001 – Martin-Gropius-Bau "Theatre of Nature and Art": "Meditierende Gruppe" (Skulpturengruppe)
2001 – Goethe-Institut, Naples, Bucharest and Budapest Exhibition "Age of Anxiety" (Eroeffnungsreden: Imre Kertész, Andrei Pleșu)
1999 – "Age of Anxiety" in Galerie Forum Amalienpark, Berlin: 99 paintings inspired by W. H. Auden's poem of the same title (opening speech: Moshe Zuckermann)
1998 – Galerie Ariadne in Vienna (opening speech: Herbert Lachmayer)
1998 – Ägyptisches Museum, Berlin (opening speech: Elmar Zorn)
1997–2001 – Einstein Forum, Potsdam with pictures and sculptures (opening speech: Gary Smith)
1997 – Berlin-Brandenburgische Akademie der Wissenschaften (opening speech: Dieter Simon)
1995 – Givat Ha Viva Kibbutz, (Israel) Exhibition "Monster" (20 paintings) followed by publication of the book "Abortion" with images and essays edited by Sander Gilman (opening speech: Yehuda Elkana)

Artist in residence (selection)
2010/11  – Artist-in-Residence Käte Hamburger Kolleg "Law as Culture", Bonn
2008 – Visiting Artist at the University of California in Santa Cruz
2006 – Artist-in-Residence Villa Montalvo and Don Lucas Artists Program
2005 – McCloy Fellowship in Art
2000 – Getty Center Los Angeles
1998 – Collegium Helveticum Zürich, Exhibition and Artist in Residence ETH Zürich
1996/97  – Invitation to International Artists House in Herzliya, Israel (6 months): sculpture "The Stone Merchant" and Exhibition (Text: "The Stone Beast has lost its earlobe")

Curator (selection)
2011 – Curator of the conference "Guilt II" at the Käte Hamburger Kolleg "Law as Culture" Bonn, including guest speakers , Toshio Hosokawa, Fawwaz Traboulsi and Ryoko Aoki
2010 – Curator of the conference "Guilt I" at the Käte Hamburger Kolleg "Right as Culture" Bonn, including guest speakers Sudhir Kakar, Ramin Jahanbegloo, Antjie Krog and Fritz Lichtenhahn
2009 – Consultant for Exhibition design "Images in the Islamic World" in Martin-Gropius-Bau, Berlin
2009 – Guest Professor for Stage Design at UCSC, USA.

References

External links

Biografie mit Foto

1973 births
Living people
German sculptors
German male sculptors
Artists from Berlin